Hellinsia inulaevorus is a moth of the family Pterophoridae that can be found in France and Italy.

References

inulaevorus
Moths described in 1989
Plume moths of Europe